Himenoi-ike Dam  is an earthfill dam located in Kochi Prefecture in Japan. The dam is used for irrigation. The dam impounds about 2.97  ha of land when full and can store 171 thousand cubic meters of water. The construction of the dam was completed in 1960.

See also
List of dams in Japan

References

Dams in Kōchi Prefecture